Eason Chan is a Hong Kong singer, songwriter, actor who has been honoured multiple times in Cantonese music and Mandopop.

Beijing Pop Music Awards 

!
|-
|2008
|Eason Chan
|Best Male Artist(Chinese:年度最佳男歌手)
|
|
|-
|2009
|Eason Chan
|Best Male Artist(Chinese:年度最佳男歌手)
|
|

CASH Golden Sail Music Awards 

!
|-
!scope="row" rowspan="2"|2011
!scope="row" rowspan="2"|Eason Chan/Twisted World(Traditional/Chinese:六月飛霜/六月飞霜）
|Best Male Performance(Chinese:最佳男歌手演绎)
|
|
|-
|CASH Best Song(Chinese:CASH最佳歌曲大奖)
|
|

CCTV-MTV Music Awards 

!
|-
|2008
|Eason Chan
|Favorite Male:Hong Kong(Chinese:香港地区年度最受欢迎男歌手奖)
|
|

China Music Awards 

!
|-
!scope="row" rowspan="2"|2001
|Eason Chan
|Outstanding Performance Award(Chinese:卓越歌艺奖)
|
|
|-
|Love is Doubting(Chinese:爱是怀疑)
|Favorite Song(Chinese:最受欢迎歌曲)
|
|

Chinese Music Awards 

!
|-
!scope="row" rowspan="3"|2011
|Time Flies  
|Top 10 Mandarin Albums(Chinese:十大华语唱片)
|
|
|-
|Tourbillon(Traditional/Chinese:陀飛輪/陀飞轮)
|Top 10 Mandarin Songs(Chinese:十大华语金曲)
|
|
|-
|Eason Chan
|Best Cantonese Male Singer(Chinese:最佳粤语男歌手奖)
|
|

Golden Melody Awards 

!
|-
!scope="row" rowspan="2"|2003
|Eason Chan
|Best Mandarin Male Singer(Chinese:最佳国语男演唱人奖)
|
|
|-
|Special Thanks To(Chinese:最佳国语专辑)
|Best Mandarin Album
|
|

IFPI Hong Kong Top Sales Music Award 

!
|-
|2003
|Black,White,Gray(Chinese:黑白灰)
|IFPI Top 10 Selling Mandrin Album(IFPI十大最高销量国语唱片)
|
|
|-
|2011
|Tourbillon(Traditional/Chinese:陀飛輪/陀飞轮)
|Top 10 Degital Selling Songs(Chinese:十大数码畅销歌曲奖)
|
|

Jade Solid Gold Best Ten Music Awards 

!
|-
!scope="row" rowspan="2"|1998
|Full of Whims in My Mind(Chinese:大激想)
|Favorite Jingle:Bronze Prize(Chinese:最受歡迎廣告歌曲獎-銅獎)
|
|
|-
|Matchless(Traditional/Chinese:天下無雙)
!scope="row" rowspan="3"|Top 10 Smash Hits(Chinese:十大勁歌金曲獎)
|
|
|-
|2000
|King of Karaoke(Chinese:K歌之王)
|
|
|-
!scope="row" rowspan="2"|2002
!scope="row" rowspan="2"|Today Next Year(Chinese:明年今日)
|
|
|-
|Gold Prize Song(Chinese:金曲金獎)
|
|
|-
|2003
|Want you back(Chinese:十面埋伏)
|Top 10 Smash Hits(Chinese:十大勁歌金曲獎)
|
|
|-
!scope="row" rowspan="2"|2005
|Sunset(Chinese:夕陽無限好）
|Top 10 Smash Hits(Chinese:十大勁歌金曲獎)
|
|
|-
|Liston(Chinese:聽聽)
|Favorite Jingle:Bronze Prize(Chinese:最受歡迎廣告歌曲獎-金獎)
|
|
|-
!scope="row" rowspan="2"|2006
|Best Friend(Chinese:最佳損友)
||Top 10 Smash Hits(Chinese:十大勁歌金曲獎)
|
|
|-
!scope="row" rowspan="2"|Eason Chan
!scope="row" rowspan="2"|Favorite Male Singer(Chinese:最受歡迎男歌星）
|
|
|-
!scope="row" rowspan="3"|2007
|
|
|-
|Eliminated(Chinese:淘汰)
|Favorite Mandarin Song(Traditional/Chinese:最受歡迎華語歌曲獎銀獎/最受欢迎华语歌曲奖银奖)
|
|
|-
|Sorrow Is Meaningless(Traditional/Chinese:富士山下）
||Top 10 Smash Hits(Traditional/Chinese:十大勁歌金曲獎/十大劲歌金曲奖)
|
|
|-
!scope="row" rowspan="2"|2008
|Worship(Traditional/Chinese:歌頒/歌颂）
|Top 10 Smash Hits(Traditional/Chinese:十大勁歌金曲獎/十大劲歌金曲奖)
|
|
|-
|Eason Chan
|Favorite Male Singer in Aaian Pacific Area(Traditional/Chinese:亞太區最受歡迎男歌星/亚太区最受欢迎男歌星）
|
|

Metro Radio Hits Music Awards 

!
|-
!scope="row" rowspan="3"|2001
!scope="row" rowspan="2"|Shall We Talk
|Top SMASH Hits(Traditional/Chinese:勁爆歌曲/劲爆歌曲）
|
!scope="row" rowspan="3"|
|-
|SMASH Worldwide Song(Traditional/Chinese:勁爆全球歌曲/劲爆全球歌曲）
|
|-
|Shall We Dance?Shall We Talk!
|Four Stations Joint:Album Award(Traditional/Chinese:四台聯頒大碟獎/四台联颁大碟奖)
|
|-
!scope="row" rowspan="2"|2003
!scope="row" rowspan="2"|Want You Back(Traditional/Chinese:十面埋伏)
|Top SMASH Hits(Traditional/Chinese:勁爆歌曲/劲爆歌曲）
|
|
|-
|Four Stations Joint:Song Award(Traditional/Chinese:四台聯頒音樂大獎 - 歌曲獎/四台联颁音乐大奖 - 歌曲奖)
|
|
|-
!scope="row" rowspan="6"|2005
!scope="row" rowspan="2"|Grandiose(Traditional/Chinese:浮誇/浮夸)
|Top SMASH Hits(Traditional/Chinese:勁爆歌曲/劲爆歌曲）
|
!scope="row" rowspan="6"|
|-
|My Favorite Song(Traditional/Chinese:勁爆我最欣賞歌曲/劲爆我最欣賞歌曲)
|
|-
!scope="row" rowspan="2"|Sunset(Traditional/Chinese:夕陽無限好/夕阳无限好）
|Top Smash Hits(Traditional/Chinese:勁爆歌曲/劲爆歌曲）
|
|-
|SMASH Song of the Year(Traditional/Chinese:勁爆年度歌曲/劲爆年度歌曲）
|
|-
|U87
|SMASH Album(Traditional/Chinese:勁爆大碟/劲爆大碟）
|
|-
|Eason Chan
|SMASH Male(Traditional/Chinese:勁爆男歌手/劲爆男歌手)
|
|-
!scope="row" rowspan="6"|2006
|Be Your Man(Traditional/Chinese:裙下之臣）
!scope="row" rowspan="2"|Top Smash Hits(Traditional/Chinese:勁爆歌曲/劲爆歌曲）
|
|
|-
|Best Friend(Traditional/Chinese:最佳損友/最佳损友)
|
|
|-
!scope="row" rowspan="2"|Eason Chan
|SMASH Mandarin Male(Traditional/Chinese:勁爆國语男歌手/劲爆国语男歌手)
|
|
|-
|SMASH Male(Traditional/Chinese:勁爆男歌手/劲爆男歌手)
|
|
|-
|Life Continues...
|SMASH Album(Traditional/Chinese:勁爆大碟/劲爆大碟）
|
|
|-
|Eason Chan
!scope="row" rowspan="2"|SMASH Worldwide Stage Performance Award(Traditional/Chinese:勁爆全球舞台大獎/劲爆全球舞台大奖）
|
|
|-
!scope="row" rowspan="5"|2007
!scope="row" rowspan="2"|Eason Chan
|
|
|-
|SMASH Worldwide Singer(Traditional/Chinese:勁爆全球歌手/劲爆全球歌手)
|
|
|-
|Crying in the Party
|Top SMASH Hits(Traditional/Chinese:勁爆歌曲/劲爆歌曲）
|
|
|-
|富士山下(Traditional/Chinese:富士山下)
|My Favorite Song(Traditional/Chinese:勁爆我最欣賞歌曲/劲爆我最欣賞歌曲)
|
|
|-
|Listen to Eason Chan
|SMASH Album(Traditional/Chinese:勁爆年度大碟/劲爆年度大碟）
|
|
|-
!scope="row" rowspan="5"|2008
|Wheel of the Era(Traditional/Chinese:時代巨輪/时代巨轮)
|Top SMASH Hits(Traditional/Chinese:勁爆歌曲/劲爆歌曲）
|
|
|-
!scope="row" rowspan="3"|Eason Chan
|SMASH Worldwide Singer(Traditional/Chinese:勁爆全球歌手/劲爆全球歌手)
|
|
|-
|SMASH Male(Traditional/Chinese:勁爆男歌手/劲爆男歌手)
|
|
|-
|My Favorite Male(Traditional/Chinese:勁爆我最欣賞男歌手/劲爆我最欣賞男歌手)
|
|
|-
|That's Just Life(Chinese:路一直都在)
|SMASH Worldwide Song(Traditional/Chinese:勁爆全球歌曲/劲爆全球歌曲）
|
|
|-
!scope="row" rowspan="6"|2009
!scope="row" rowspan="2"|7 Hundreds Later(Traditional/Chinese:七百年後/七百年后)
|Metro Top SMASH Hits(Traditional/Chinese:新城勁爆歌曲/新城劲爆歌曲）
|
!scope="row" rowspan="6"|
|-
|Metro SMASH Worldwide Song(Traditional/Chinese:新城全球勁爆歌曲/新城全球劲爆歌曲）
|
|-
|H3M
|Metro SMASH Album of the Year(Traditional/Chinese:新城勁爆年度專輯/新城劲爆年度专辑)
|
|-
!scope="row" rowspan="3"|Eason Chan
|Metro SMASH King of Pop((Traditional/Chinese:新城勁爆流行歌王榮譽大獎/新城劲爆流行歌王荣誉大奖）
|
|-
|Metro SMASH Male(Traditional/Chinese:新城勁爆男歌手/新城劲爆男歌手)
|
|-
|Metro SMASH Worldwide Singer(Traditional/Chinese:新城全球勁爆歌手/新城全球劲爆歌手)
|
|-
!scope="row" rowspan="5"|2010
|Naked(Traditional/Chinese:一絲不掛/一丝不挂)
|Top SMASH Hits(Traditional/Chinese:勁爆歌曲/劲爆歌曲）
|
!scope="row" rowspan="5"|
|-
|Eason Chan,Rowena Cortes(Chinese:露云娜)/Talk About Men or Women((Traditional/Chinese:講男講女/讲男讲女）
|Metro SMASH Collaboration (Traditional/Chinese:新城勁爆合唱歌曲/新城劲爆合唱歌曲）
|
|-
!scope="row" rowspan="3"|Eason Chan
|Metro SMASH Worldwide Singer(Traditional/Chinese:新城全球勁爆歌手/新城全球劲爆歌手)
|
|-
|Metro My Favorite Male(Traditional/Chinese:新城勁爆我最欣賞男歌手/新城劲爆我最欣賞男歌手)
|
|-
|Metro SMASH Worldwide Stage Performance Award(Traditional/Chinese:新城全球勁爆舞台大獎/新城全球劲爆舞台大奖）
|
|-
!scope="row" rowspan="4"|2011
!scope="row" rowspan="2"|Eason Chan
|Metro SMASH Worldwide Singer(Traditional/Chinese:新城全球勁爆歌手/新城全球劲爆歌手)
|
!scope="row" rowspan="4"|
|-
|Metro SMASH Most Playing Award(Traditional/Chinese:新城勁爆播放指數大獎(歌手獎)/新城劲爆播放指数大奖（歌手奖））
|
|-
|Bitter Melon(Traditional/Chinese:苦瓜)
|SMASH Song of the Year(Traditional/Chinese:勁爆年度歌曲/劲爆年度歌曲）
|
|-
|Twisted World(Traditional/Chinese:六月飛霜/六月飞霜）
|Metro SMASH Worldwide Song(Traditional/Chinese:新城全球勁爆歌曲/新城全球劲爆歌曲）
|
|-

Metro Radio Mandarin Hits Music Awards 

!
|-
!scope="row" rowspan="5"|2008
!scope="row" rowspan="2"|That's Just Life(Chinese:路一直都在)
|Mandarin Force Song of the Year(Chinese:新城国语力年度歌曲大奖)
|
|
|-
|Mandarin Force Songs(Chinese:新城国语力歌曲)
|
|
|-
!scope="row" rowspan="3"|Eason Chan
|Mandarin Force Male Singer(Chinese:新城国语力男歌手)
|
|
|-
|Mandarin Force Singer of the Year(Chinese:新城国语力年度歌手大奖)
|
|
|-
|Mandarin Force Performance Award(Chinese:新城国语力演绎奖)
|
|
|-
!scope="row" rowspan="4"|2009
!scope="row" rowspan="3"|Eason Chan
|Mandarin Force Favorite Singer;Hong Kong(Chinese:国语力全国最受欢迎歌手:香港)
|
|
|-
|Global Favorite Singer(Chinese:全球最受欢迎至尊歌手大奖）
|
|
|-
|Mandarin Force Global Stage Perforence Award(Chinese:新城国语力全球至尊舞台大奖)
|
|
|-
|Now What(Chinese:然后怎样)
|Mandarin Force Song of the Year(Chinese:新城国语力年度歌曲大奖)
|
|
|-
!scope="row" rowspan="4"|2011
!scope="row" rowspan="2"|Eason Chan
|Global Favorite Singer(Chinese:全球最受欢迎至尊歌手大奖）
|
|
|-
|Mandarin Force Singer of the Year(Chinese:新城国语力年度歌手大奖)
|
|
|-
|Because Love(Chinese:因为爱情)
!scope="row" rowspan="2"|Mandarin Force Songs(Chinese:新城国语力歌曲)
|
|
|-
|Waiting for You Loving Me(Chinese:等你爱我)
|
|

Music King Awards 

!
|-
|2009
|Eason Chan
|Favorite Male Singer(Hong Kong & Tai Wan)(Chinese:港台最受欢迎男歌手)
|
|

MY Astro Music Awards 

!
|-
!scope="row" rowspan="3"|2009
|7 Hundreds Later(Traditional/Chinese:七百年後/七百年后)
|Top Hits(Chinese:至尊金曲)
|
|
|-
|Guilty(Traditional/Chinese:于心有愧)
|Top Hits(Chinese:至尊金曲)
|
|
|-
|Eason Chan
|Oversea Best Male(Chinese:至尊海外男歌手奖)
|
|

RTHK Top 10 Gold Songs Awards 

!
|-
|1997
|Be With Me(Traditional/Chinese:與我常在/与我常在)
|Best Original Song(Traditional/Chinese:最佳原創歌曲獎/最佳原创歌曲）
|
|
|-
!scope="row" rowspan="2"|1998
|Matchless(Traditional/Chinese:天下無雙/天下无双)
|Top 10 Mandarin Hits(Traditional/Chinese:十大中文金曲)
|
!scope="row" rowspan="2"|
|-
|Eason Chan
|Break-through Award(Traditional/Chinese:飛躍大獎/飞跃大奖)
|
|-
!scope="row" rowspan="4"|2001
!scope="row" rowspan="3"|Shall We Talk
|Top 10 Mandarin Hits(Traditional/Chinese:十大中文金曲)
|
!scope="row" rowspan="4"|
|-
|Favorite Karaoke Song:Male(Traditional/Chinese:最愛歡迎卡拉ok歌曲獎/最受欢迎卡拉OK歌曲奖）
|
|-
|Top Song in Mandarin World(Traditional/Chinese:全球華人至尊金曲)
|
|-
|Eason Chan
|Four Stations Joint:Media Award(Traditional/Chinese:四台聯頒獎項:傳媒大獎/四台联颁:传媒大奖）
|
|-
!scope="row" rowspan="2"|2002
!scope="row" rowspan="2"|Today Next Year(Traditional/Chinese:明年今日)
|Top Song in Mandarin World(Traditional/Chinese:全球華人至尊金曲)
|
|
|-
|Top 10 Mandarin Hits(Traditional/Chinese:十大中文金曲)
|
|
|-
!scope="row" rowspan="2"|2003
!scope="row" rowspan="2"|Want You Back(Traditional/Chinese:十面埋伏)
|Top 10 Mandarin Hits(Traditional/Chinese:十大中文金曲)
|
|
|-
|Top Song in Mandarin World(Traditional/Chinese:全球華人至尊金曲)
|
|
|-
!scope="row" rowspan="6"|2005
!scope="row" rowspan="3"|Sunset(Traditional/Chinese:夕陽無限好/夕阳无限好）
|Top Song in Mandarin World(Traditional/Chinese:全球華人至尊金曲)
|
|
|-
|Top 10 Hits(Traditional/Chinese:十大金曲獎/十大金曲奖)
|
|
|-
|Favorite Mandarin Song:Silver Prize(Traditional/Chinese:全國最受歡迎中文歌曲獎銀獎/全国最受欢迎中文歌曲奖银奖)
|
|
|-
!scope="row" rowspan="5"|Eason Chan
|Favorite Male Singer:Silver Prize(Traditional/Chinese:全國最受歡迎歌手獎(男歌手銀獎)/全国最受欢迎歌手奖（男歌手银奖）)
|
|
|-
|Best Pop Male(Traditional/Chinese:最優秀流行男歌手大獎/最优秀流行男歌手大奖）
|
|
|-
|Excellent Pop Singer((Traditional/Chinese:優秀流行歌手大獎/优秀流行歌手大奖)
|
|
|-
!scope="row" rowspan="3"|2006
|Best Pop Male(Traditional/Chinese:最優秀流行男歌手大獎/最优秀流行男歌手大奖）
|
|
|-
|Excellent Pop Singer((Traditional/Chinese:優秀流行歌手大獎/优秀流行歌手大奖)
|
|
|-
|Best Friend(Traditional/Chinese:最佳損友)
|Top 10 Hits(Traditional/Chinese:十大金曲獎/十大金曲奖)
|
|
|-
!scope="row" rowspan="5"|2007
!scope="row" rowspan="3"|Eason Chan
|Top Selling Male of the Year(Traditional/Chinese:全年最高銷量歌手男歌手大獎/全年最高销量男歌手大奖)
|
|
|-
|Best Pop Male(Traditional/Chinese:最優秀流行男歌手大獎/最优秀流行男歌手大奖）
|
|
|-
|Excellent Pop Singer((Traditional/Chinese:優秀流行歌手大獎/优秀流行歌手大奖)
|
|
|-
!scope="row" rowspan="2"|Sorrow Is Meaningless(Traditional/Chinese:富士山下）
|Top 10 Hits(Traditional/Chinese:十大金曲獎/十大金曲奖)
|
|
|-
|Top Song in Mandarin World(Traditional/Chinese:全球華人至尊金曲)
|
|
|-
!scope="row" rowspan="2"|2008
!scope="row" rowspan="2"|Eason Chan
|Excellent Pop Singer((Traditional/Chinese:優秀流行歌手大獎/优秀流行歌手大奖)
|
|
|-
|Top Selling Male of the Year(Traditional/Chinese:全年最高銷量歌手男歌手大獎/全年最高销量男歌手大奖)
|
|
|-
!scope="row" rowspan="6"|2009
!scope="row" rowspan="2"|(Traditional/Chinese:七百年後/七百年后)
|Top 10 Hits(Traditional/Chinese:十大金曲獎/十大金曲奖)
|
!scope="row" rowspan="6"|
|-
|Top 10 Hits(Traditional/Chinese:十大金曲獎/十大金曲奖)
|
|-
!scope="row" rowspan="4"|Eason Chan
|Excellent Pop Singer((Traditional/Chinese:優秀流行歌手大獎/优秀流行歌手大奖)
|
|-
|Best Pop Male(Traditional/Chinese:最優秀流行男歌手大獎/最优秀流行男歌手大奖）
|
|-
|Top Selling Male of the Year(Traditional/Chinese:全年最高銷量歌手男歌手大獎/全年最高销量男歌手大奖)
|
|-
|Best Male(Traditional/Chinese:全國最佳歌手男歌手獎/全国最佳歌手男歌手奖）
|
|-
!scope="row" rowspan="7"|2010
|Tourbillon(Traditional/Chinese:陀飛輪/陀飞轮)
|Top 10 Hits(Traditional/Chinese:十大金曲獎/十大金曲奖)
|
!scope="row" rowspan="7"|
|-
!scope="row" rowspan="3"|Eason Chan
|Excellent Pop Singer((Traditional/Chinese:優秀流行歌手大獎/优秀流行歌手大奖)
|
|-
|Best Pop Male(Traditional/Chinese:最優秀流行男歌手大獎/最优秀流行男歌手大奖）
|
|-
|Top Selling Male of the Year(Traditional/Chinese:全年最高銷量歌手男歌手大獎/全年最高销量男歌手大奖)
|
|-
|Tourbillon(Traditional/Chinese:陀飛輪/陀飞轮)
|Top Song in Mandarin World(Traditional/Chinese:全球華人至尊金曲)
|
|-
|Eason Chan
|Media Recommendation Award:Male(Traditional/Chinese:傳媒推薦大獎男歌手/传媒推荐大奖男歌手）
|
|-
|Tourbillon(Traditional/Chinese:陀飛輪/陀飞轮)
|Media Recommendation Award:Song(Traditional/Chinese:傳媒推薦大獎歌曲/传媒推荐大奖歌曲)
|
|-
!scope="row" rowspan="5"|2011
|Twisted World(Traditional/Chinese:六月飛霜/六月飞霜)
|Top 10 Hits(Traditional/Chinese:十大金曲獎/十大金曲奖)
|
!scope="row" rowspan="5"|
|-
!scope="row" rowspan="4"|Eason Chan
|Excellent Pop Singer((Traditional/Chinese:優秀流行歌手大獎/优秀流行歌手大奖)
|
|-
|Best Pop Male(Traditional/Chinese:最優秀流行男歌手大獎/最优秀流行男歌手大奖）
|
|-
|Top Selling Male of the Year(Traditional/Chinese:全年最高銷量歌手男歌手大獎/全年最高销量男歌手大奖)
|
|-
|Best Male(Traditional/Chinese:全國最佳歌手男歌手獎/全国最佳歌手男歌手奖）
|

SINA Music Polls Awards 

!
|-
|2006
|Sorrow Is Meaningless(Traditional/Chinese:富士山下）
|Highest New Song Premiere Rating(Chinese:新歌试听最高收听率歌曲奖)
|
|
|-
|2009
|H3M
|My Favorite Album(Chinese:我最喜爱至尊大碟)
|
|
|-
!scope="row" rowspan="2"|2011
|Stranger Under My Skin
|My Favorite Album(Chinese:我最喜爱至尊大碟)
|
|
|-
|Eason Chan
|Sino Weibo Male Artist(Chinese:新浪微博发声男歌手奖)
|
|

Star Awards 

!
|-
!scope="row" rowspan="2"|2008
|Eason Chan
|Male Artist of the Year(Hong Kong&Tan Wan)(Chinese:港台地区年度男歌手)
|
|
|-
|Don't want to let go(Chinese:不想放手)
|Album of the Year(Hong Kong&Tan Wan)(Chinese:港台地区年度专辑)
|
|
|-
|2009
|Eason Chan
|Male Artist of the Year(Hong Kong&Tan Wan)(Chinese:港台地区年度男歌手)
|
|

Top Chinese Music Awards 

!
|-
!scope="row" rowspan="5"|2009
|Eason Chan/Don't want to let go(Chinese:不想放手)
|Best Male Artist(Hong Kong&Tan Wan)(Chinese:港台地区最佳男歌手)
|
|
|-
|Don't want to let go(Chinese:不想放手)
|Best Album(Hong Kong&Tan Wan)(Chinese:港台地区最佳专辑)
|
|
|-
!scope="row" rowspan="2"|That's Just Life(Chinese:路一直都在)
|Best Music Video(Chinese:最佳音乐录影带)
|
|
|-
|Best Song of the Year(Hong Kong&Tan Wan)(Chinese:港台地区最佳歌曲)
|
|
|-
|Eason Chan
|Jury Prize:Artist of the Year(Chinese:评审团大奖:年度风云大奖)
|
|

TVB8 Mandarin Music On Demand Awards 

!
|-
!scope="row" rowspan="2"|2008
|Eason Chan
|Favorite Male(Chinese:最受欢迎男歌手)
|
|
|-
|Wheel of the Era(Traditional/Chinese:時代巨輪)
|Worldwide Favorite Cantonese Song(Chinese:全球热爱粤语歌曲)
|
|

Ultimate Song Chart Awards 

!
|-
!scope="row" rowspan="3"|1998
|Matchless(Traditional/Chinese:天下無雙/天下无双)
|Professional Recommendation:Top 10 Songs(Traditional/Chinese:專業推介叱吒十大/专业推介叱咤十大)
|
|
|-
|My Happy Time(Traditional/Chinese:我的快樂時代/我的快乐时代)
|Top Album(Traditional/Chinese:叱吒樂壇至尊唱片大獎/叱咤乐坛至尊唱片大奖）
|
|
|-
|Eason Chan
|903 ID Club's Choice - Hung Hom Concert Debut(Traditional/Chinese:903 id club投選 - 首次紅館個唱/903 id club投选 - 首次红馆个唱）
|
|
|-
!scope="row" rowspan="3"|1999
!scope="row" rowspan="2"|Ferris Wheel(Traditional/Chinese:幸福摩天輪)
|Professional Recommendation:Top 10 Songs(Traditional/Chinese:專業推介叱吒十大/专业推介叱咤十大)
|
!scope="row" rowspan="3"|
|-
|My Favorite Song(Traditional/Chinese:叱吒樂壇我最喜愛的歌曲大獎/叱吒乐坛我最喜愛的歌曲大奖）
|
|-
|God Bless My love(Traditional/Chinese:天祐愛人)
|Top Album(Traditional/Chinese:叱吒樂壇至尊唱片大獎/叱咤乐坛至尊唱片大奖）
|
|-
!scope="row" rowspan="4"|2000
!scope="row" rowspan="3"|King of Karaoke(Traditional/Chinese:K歌之王)
|Professional Recommendation:Top 10 Songs(Traditional/Chinese:專業推介叱吒十大/专业推介叱咤十大)
|
!scope="row" rowspan="4"|
|-
|My Favorite Song(Traditional/Chinese:叱吒樂壇我最喜愛的歌曲大獎/叱吒乐坛我最喜愛的歌曲大奖）
|
|-
|Top Song(Traditional/Chinese:叱吒樂壇至尊歌曲大獎/叱吒乐坛至尊歌曲大奖）
|
|-
|Eason Chan
|Top Male:Silver Prize(Traditional/Chinese:叱吒樂壇男歌手銀獎/叱吒乐坛男歌手银奖）
|
|-
!scope="row" rowspan="4"|2001
|Shall We Talk
|Professional Recommendation:Top 10 Songs(Traditional/Chinese:專業推介叱吒十大/专业推介叱咤十大)
|
|
|-
|Shall We Dance?Shall We Talk!
|Top Album(Traditional/Chinese:叱吒樂壇至尊唱片大獎/叱咤乐坛至尊唱片大奖）
|
|
|-
!scope="row" rowspan="2"|Eason Chan
|Top Male:Gold Prize(Traditional/Chinese:叱吒樂壇男歌手金獎/叱吒乐坛男歌手金奖）
|
|
|-
|15-24 Years old Top Hero Award(Traditional/Chinese:叱吒樂壇15-24歲最喜愛的人人英雄/叱吒乐坛15-24岁最喜愛的人人英雄)
|
|
|-
!scope="row" rowspan="3"|2002
|Crowded(Traditional/Chinese:人来人往）
|Professional Recommendation:Top 10 Songs(Traditional/Chinese:專業推介叱吒十大/专业推介叱咤十大)
|
|
|-
|The Line-up 
|Top Album(Traditional/Chinese:叱吒樂壇至尊唱片大獎/叱咤乐坛至尊唱片大奖）
|
|
|-
|Eason Chan
|Top Male:Gold Prize(Traditional/Chinese:叱吒樂壇男歌手金獎/叱吒乐坛男歌手金奖）
|
|
|-
!scope="row" rowspan="2"|2003
|Want you back(Traditional/Chinese:十面埋伏)
|Professional Recommendation:Top 10 Songs(Traditional/Chinese:專業推介叱吒十大/专业推介叱咤十大)
|
|
|-
|Eason Chan
|Top Male:Bronze Prize(Traditional/Chinese:叱吒樂壇男歌手銅獎/叱吒乐坛男歌手铜奖）
|
|
|-
!scope="row" rowspan="7"|2005
!scope="row" rowspan="3"|Sunset(Traditional/Chinese:夕陽無限好/夕阳无限好）
|Professional Recommendation:Top 10 Songs(Traditional/Chinese:專業推介叱吒十大/专业推介叱咤十大)
|
|
|-
|Top Song(Traditional/Chinese:叱吒樂壇至尊歌曲大獎/叱吒乐坛至尊歌曲大奖）
|
|
|-
|My Favorite Song(Traditional/Chinese:叱吒樂壇我最喜愛的歌曲大獎/叱吒乐坛我最喜愛的歌曲大奖）
|
|
|-
!scope="row" rowspan="2"|Eason Chan
|Top Male:Gold Prize(Traditional/Chinese:叱吒樂壇男歌手金獎/叱吒乐坛男歌手金奖）
|
|
|-
|My Favorite Male Singer(Traditional/Chinese:叱吒樂壇我最喜愛的男歌手/叱吒乐坛我最喜愛的男歌手
|
|
|-
!scope="row" rowspan="2"|U87 
|Top Album(Traditional/Chinese:叱吒樂壇至尊唱片大獎/叱咤乐坛至尊唱片大奖）
|
|
|-
|Four Stations Joint:Album Award(Traditional/Chinese:四台聯頒大碟獎/四台联颁大碟奖)
|
|
|-
!scope="row" rowspan="3"|2006
|Sorrow Is Meaningless(Traditional/Chinese:富士山下）
|Professional Recommendation:Top 10 Songs(Traditional/Chinese:專業推介叱吒十大/专业推介叱咤十大)
|
|
|-
!scope="row" rowspan="2"|Eason Chan
|Top Male:Gold Prize(Traditional/Chinese:叱吒樂壇男歌手金獎/叱吒乐坛男歌手金奖）
|
|
|-
|My Favorite Male Singer(Traditional/Chinese:叱吒樂壇我最喜愛的男歌手/叱吒乐坛我最喜愛的男歌手)
|
|
|-
!scope="row" rowspan="4"|2007
|Crying In The Party
|Professional Recommendation:Top 10 Songs(Traditional/Chinese:專業推介叱吒十大/专业推介叱咤十大)
|
|
|-
!scope="row" rowspan="2"|Eason Chan
|Top Male:Gold Prize(Traditional/Chinese:叱吒樂壇男歌手金獎/叱吒乐坛男歌手金奖）
|
|
|-
|My Favorite Male Singer(Traditional/Chinese:叱吒樂壇我最喜愛的男歌手/叱吒乐坛我最喜愛的男歌手
|
|
|-
|Listen to Eason Chan
|Top Album(Traditional/Chinese:叱吒樂壇至尊唱片大獎/叱咤乐坛至尊唱片大奖）
|
|
|-
!scope="row" rowspan="3"|2008
|That's Just Life(Traditional/Chinese:路一直都在)
|Professional Recommendation:Top 10 Songs(Traditional/Chinese:專業推介叱吒十大/专业推介叱咤十大)
|
|
|-
!scope="row" rowspan="2"|Eason Chan
|My Favorite Male Singer(Traditional/Chinese:叱吒樂壇我最喜愛的男歌手/叱吒乐坛我最喜愛的男歌手)
|
|
|-
|Top Male:Bronze Prize(Traditional/Chinese:叱吒樂壇男歌手銅獎/叱吒乐坛男歌手銅奖）
|
|
|-
!scope="row" rowspan="5"|2009
!scope="row" rowspan="2"|7 Hundreds Later(Traditional/Chinese:七百年後/七百年后)
|Professional Recommendation:Top 10 Songs(Traditional/Chinese:專業推介叱吒十大/专业推介叱咤十大)
|
!scope="row" rowspan="5"|
|-
|My Favorite Song(Traditional/Chinese:叱吒樂壇我最喜愛的歌曲大獎/叱吒乐坛我最喜愛的歌曲大奖）
|
|-
|Eason Chan
|Top Male:Gold Prize(Traditional/Chinese:叱吒樂壇男歌手金獎/叱吒乐坛男歌手金奖）
|
|-
!scope="row" rowspan="2"|H3M
|Top Album(Traditional/Chinese:叱吒樂壇至尊唱片大獎/叱咤乐坛至尊唱片大奖）
|
|-
|Four Stations Joint:Album Award(Traditional/Chinese:四台聯頒大碟獎/四台联颁大碟奖)
|
|-
!scope="row" rowspan="5"|2010
!scope="row" rowspan="2"|Tourbillon(Traditional/Chinese:陀飛輪/陀飞轮)
|Professional Recommendation:Top 10 Songs(Traditional/Chinese:專業推介叱吒十大/专业推介叱咤十大)
|
!scope="row" rowspan="5"|
|-
|My Favorite Song(Traditional/Chinese:叱吒樂壇我最喜愛的歌曲大獎/叱吒乐坛我最喜愛的歌曲大奖）
|
|-
!scope="row" rowspan="2"|Eason Chan
|Top Male:Gold Prize(Traditional/Chinese:叱吒樂壇男歌手金獎/叱吒乐坛男歌手金奖）
|
|-
|My Favorite Male Singer(Traditional/Chinese:叱吒樂壇我最喜愛的男歌手/叱吒乐坛我最喜愛的男歌手)
|
|-
|Time Flies
|Top Album(Traditional/Chinese:叱吒樂壇至尊唱片大獎/叱咤乐坛至尊唱片大奖）
|
|-
!scope="row" rowspan="3"|2011
|Twisted World(Traditional/Chinese:六月飛霜/六月飞霜)
|Professional Recommendation:Top 10 Songs(Traditional/Chinese:專業推介叱吒十大/专业推介叱咤十大)
|
!scope="row" rowspan="3"|
|-
!scope="row" rowspan="2"|Eason Chan
|Top Male:Gold Prize(Traditional/Chinese:叱吒樂壇男歌手金獎/叱吒乐坛男歌手金奖）
|
|-
|My Favorite Male Singer(Traditional/Chinese:叱吒樂壇我最喜愛的男歌手/叱吒乐坛我最喜愛的男歌手)
|
|-

References 

Chan, Eason